Hyukoh is a South Korean indie band signed to DooRooDooRoo Artist Company. The band was formed in May 2014 and consists of leader, singer, and guitarist Oh Hyuk, bassist Im Dong-geon, guitarist Lim Hyun-jae, and drummer Lee In-woo.

Career

Band formation and rise in underground music scene 
Frontman Oh Hyuk was raised in several cities across northern China (Jilin, Shenyang and Beijing) for the first twenty years of his life due his parents' profession as university professors. Upon graduating high school in 2012, Oh moved to South Korea on his own to pursue music full-time despite his parents' strong opposition. Oh speaks Mandarin Chinese, Korean and English and his diverse cultural influences are directly reflected in Hyukoh's music, in which he infuses a mix of Korean, Mandarin Chinese and English lyrics.

Im, Lim and Lee joined Oh to form Hyukoh in 2014. Oh was previously producing music as a one-man band under the name Hyukoh, and the members eventually came together and took on the name as the current four-piece band. The members came together largely by chance: Oh had already worked with Lee in the past, and Lim attended high school with Lee. Oh was introduced to Im through a mutual acquaintance.

On September 18, 2014, Hyukoh released their debut EP 20, named after the band members' age at the time. The band experienced moderate success in South Korea, often selling out small-scale venues and gaining a strong following in Hongdae, an area in Seoul known for being the epicenter of  South Korea's indie music scene.

Rise in mainstream popularity 
In 2015, the band gained mainstream popularity after participating in the popular Korean variety program Infinite Challenge, performing "Wonderful Barn" in collaboration with Jung Hyung-don at Yeongdong Expressway Song Festival. The band received positive responses from critics and the public, charting in the top ten of the Billboard World Albums Chart two months after the release of their second EP 22, also named after the band members' age at the time. 

On July 21, 2015, Hyukoh became the first act to sign with independent label HIGHGRND, a subsidiary of Korean media conglomerate YG Entertainment.

On April 30 and May 2, 2016, the band performed at Strawberry Music Festival in Shanghai and Beijing, representing Korean indie bands. They also performed at the Summer Sonic Festival in Japan in August 2016.

The band released their first studio album, 23, on April 24, 2017. The title track, "Tomboy", placed second on the Melon digital chart and first on Genie, Bugs, and Olleh digital charts not long after its release. The album also placed sixth on Billboard's World Albums Chart in May 2017. Following the release of 23, the band went on their first world tour.

Music by the band featured on a TV commercial released in June 2018 by Apple Inc. for the iPhone X smartphone. The song featured was Citizen Kane.

2020 World Tour 
Hyukoh planned to kick off their tour in February 2020, visiting places such as Seoul, making their way around Asia, Europe, and North America.

However the majority of the tour was cancelled due to COVID-19 travel restrictions, with the group only being able to fulfil the Seoul and Japan dates before the pandemic struck.

Mandatory military service 
Im Dong-geon enlisted for his mandatory military service on April 20, 2021. He was seen off by family, friends and the members. The location and time were private.

Musical style 
Hyukoh has also been recognized for their attention to the band's visual aesthetic, ranging from their music videos to wardrobe choices. The band frequently works with photographer Han Dasom and videographer Jung Dawoon (DQM), who are members of the creative group Dadaism Club. They met in 2014.

Oh has cited The Beatles and The Whitest Boy Alive as major influences in the band's musical style.

Members
 Oh Hyuk (오혁) – vocals, guitar, songwriter
 Lim Hyun-jae (임현제) – lead guitar
 Im Dong-geon (임동건) – bass
 Lee In-woo (이인우) – drums

Controversy
Following their rise to fame, Hyukoh has faced multiple accusations of plagiarism. In 2015, internet users suggested that their song "Lonely" was derived from "1517" by German-Norwegian band The Whitest Boy Alive, while "Panda Bear" was compared to Yumi Zouma's "Dodi". On July 24, HIGHGRND released a statement addressing these rumors, stating Hyukoh had received compliments on "Lonely" from The Whitest Boy Alive frontman Erlend Øye after performing the track as an opener for him while he visited Korea. The label also clarified that "Panda Bear" was released months before Yumi Zouma's "Dodi", making the suspected plagiarism impossible.

"Panda Bear" faced accusations again as a copy of American indie band Beach Fossils's "Golden Age". These suspicions were furthered by a now-deleted tweet from Beach Fossils suggesting Hyukoh had mixed "Golden Age" to create "Panda Bear". Hyukoh leader Oh Hyuk later posted a screenshot of this Tweet to his Instagram account refuting the claims.

Discography

Studio albums

Extended plays

Singles

Other charted songs

Music videos

Concerts
2015 Hyukoh year end concert "22" in Seoul, South Korea
2016 Hyukoh year end concert "22" in Seoul, South Korea
2017 Hyukoh concert "23" in Kuala Lumpur, Malaysia
2017 Hyukoh concert "23" in Seoul, South Korea
2017 Hyukoh concert "23" in Hong Kong
2017 Hyukoh concert "23" in Singapore
2017 Hyukoh concert "23" in Jakarta, Indonesia
2017 Hyukoh Europe “Tour”
 London (Oct. 27, ULU live)
 Paris (Oct. 29, YOYO Palais de Tokyo )
 Amsterdam (Nov. 1, Q Factory)
2017 Hyukoh North America “Tour”
 Toronto, ON (Sept. 8, Opera House)
 Boston, MA (Sept. 10, Middle East)
 New York City, NY (Sept. 11, Irving Plaza )
 Vancouver, BC (Sept, 14, Albatross Music Festival)
 San Francisco, CA (Sept. 15 Social Hall)
 Seattle, WA (Sept. 17, Columbia City Theater)
 Los Angeles, CA (Sept. 19, The Mayan) 
 Arcadia, CA (Sept. 23, Modern Sky Festival) 
 '24' How To Find True Love And Happiness 2018 'NA'
 Dallas, TX (Sept. 13, Trees) 
 Austin, TX (Sept. 14, Stubb's Jr)
 Houston, TX (Sept. 15, White Oak Music Hall) 
 Atlanta, GA (Sept. 17, Terminal West) 
 Washington, DC (Sept. 19, U Street Music Hall)
 New York City, NY (Sept. 20, Irving Plaza) 
 Philadelphia, PA (Sept. 23, Foundry) 
 Boston, MA (Sept. 24, Paradise) 
 Toronto, ON (Sept. 26, Phoenix Concert Hall) 
 Chicago,IL (Sept. 26, Lincoln Hall) 
 St. Paul, MN (Sept. 29, Amsterdam Bar & Hall) 
 Seattle, WA (Oct. 2, Showbox)
 Vancouver, BC (Oct. 3, Commodore) 
 Portland, OR (Oct. 4, Doug Fir)
 Berkeley, CA (Oct. 6, UC Theater) 
 Los Angeles, CA (Oct. 7, The Wiltern) 
 Pomona, CA (Oct. 9, Glass House)
2019 '24' How To Find True Love And Happiness - Europe Tour

From  February 26, 2019 to  March 15, 2019 : European Tour《24: how to find true love and happiness》
February 26  : Gorilla, Manchester (UK)
February 27 : Electric Brixton, Londres (UK)
March 1 : Le Trianon, Paris (France)
March 2 : Melkweg, Amsterdam (Netherlands)
March 3: Ancienne Belgique, Brussels (Belgium)
March 5 : Gloria, Cologne (Germany)
March 6 :Kesselhaus, Berlin (Germany)
March 7 : Zoom, Frankfurt (Germany)
March 9 :Legend Club, Milan (Italy)
March 11 : Apolo, Barcelone (Spain)
March 12 : Cool Stage, Madrid (Spain)
March 13: Capitolio, Lisbon (Portugal)
March 15: Izvestia Hall,  Moscow (Russia )
2019: Coachella Valley Music and Arts Festival ( Sundays 14 and 21 of April)

Awards and nominations

References

External links

 

K-pop music groups
South Korean indie rock groups
Korean Music Award winners
Melon Music Award winners